Grafton is a town in Grafton County, New Hampshire, United States. The population was 1,385 at the 2020 census.

History 

Originally granted in 1761, and re-granted in 1769, Grafton, like the county it resides in, takes its name from Augustus FitzRoy, 3rd Duke of Grafton, a relative of colonial governor Benning Wentworth. Grafton was incorporated in 1778.

Historically, Grafton's economic base consisted of subsistence farming, small-scale industry, and mining. Several mica mines and granite quarries once dotted the town's landscape, most notably Ruggles Mine.

Geography 
The majority of the town is drained to the east by the Smith River, a tributary of the Pemigewasset River, while the western side of the town drains by several brooks toward the Mascoma River, a tributary of the Connecticut. Grafton Pond is in the western part of town.

Demographics 

As of the census of 2010, there were 1,340 people, 564 households, and 372 families residing in the town.  The population density was 32.1 people per square mile (12.4/km2).  There were 839 housing units at an average density of 20.1 per square mile (7.8/km2). The racial makeup of the town was 96.7% White, 0.3% African American, 0.2% Native American, 0.4% Asian, 0.1% some other race, and 2.2% from two or more races. Hispanic or Latino of any race were 1.5% of the population.

There were 564 households, out of which 24.1% had children under the age of 18 living with them, 54.4% were headed by married couples living together, 7.1% had a female householder with no husband present, and 34.0% were non-families. 26.4% of all households were made up of individuals, and 7.4% consisted of someone living alone who was 65 years of age or older.  The average household size was 2.38, and the average family size was 2.84.

In the town, the population was spread out, with 18.8% under the age of 18, 5.2% from 18 to 24, 23.7% from 25 to 44, 36.5% from 45 to 64, and 14.6% who were 65 years of age or older.  The median age was 45.6 years. For every 100 females, there were 108.7 males.  For every 100 females age 18 and over, there were 112.1 males.

At the 2000 census, the median income for a household in the town was $38,654, and the median income for a family was $41,875. Males had a median income of $30,074 versus $23,750 for females. The per capita income for the town was $16,944.  About 4.2% of families and 7.9% of the population were below the poverty line, including 10.0% of those under age 18 and 4.1% of those age 65 or over.

Government
Grafton is governed by a three-person select board.

Politics

Grafton County, within which the town of Grafton resides, ranks number 100 in terms of highest property taxes levied in the United States. As of 2019, Grafton itself has the 16th highest property tax rate in the state of New Hampshire.

Grafton is an active hub for Libertarians as part of the Free Town Project, an offshoot of the Free State Project. Grafton's appeal as a favorable destination was due to its absence of zoning laws and a very low property tax rate. Grafton was the focus of a movement begun by members of the Free State Project that sought to encourage libertarians to move to the town.

Notable people

 Monroe Heath (1827–1894), mayor of Chicago from 1876–1879
 Myra Belle Martin (1861–?), teacher, writer, financier in late 19th century and early 20th century
 Cyrus A. Sulloway (1839–1917), congressman

Sites of interest 
 Ruggles Mine (closed)

References

External links 
 
 
 New Hampshire Economic and Labor Market Information Bureau Profile

Towns in Grafton County, New Hampshire
Populated places established in 1778
Towns in New Hampshire